A bakery is a place to make bread.

The Bakery, short by Laurel and Hardy
"The Bakery", list of songs recorded by Arctic Monkeys